The San Luis II Port of Entry is a commercial port of entry, in that it only accepts commercial trucks entering the United States for inspection. It connects San Luis, Arizona with San Luis Río Colorado, Sonora. Passenger cars and pedestrians are directed to cross at the San Luis downtown crossing.  The Port of Entry was built 5 miles east of the downtown crossing in 2010 in an effort to divert the commercial truck traffic and ease congestion.  Roads connecting to Interstate 8 were improved to support the additional traffic.

See also

 List of Mexico–United States border crossings
 List of Canada–United States border crossings

References

External links

Mexico–United States border crossings
2010 establishments in Arizona
Buildings and structures in Yuma County, Arizona
Buildings and structures completed in 2010